Remember Love is the fourth solo album by jazz pianist Mike Garson, and was released in 1989.

Track listing

References

External links
Mp3.com - Remember Love Track listing of album
 mikegarson.com Official Website with Discography

Mike Garson albums
1989 albums